John Peltz (April 23, 1861 – February 27, 1906) was a professional baseball player in the 19th century. Peltz first played with the Indianapolis Hoosiers, in 1884 at the age of 23. He batted .219 and surrendered 38 errors in the outfield. Peltz did not appear in major league baseball until 1890, except for a brief one-game appearance in 1888 with the Baltimore Orioles. In 1890, his last year in the major leagues, he played with three teams, the Brooklyn Gladiators, Syracuse Stars, and the Toledo Maumees. He would continue to play with various minor league clubs until 1893, retiring with the Montgomery Colts. Peltz had a career batting average of .224. He died in New Orleans on February 27, 1906, at the age of 44.

Sources

Baltimore Orioles (AA) players
Indianapolis Hoosiers (AA) players
Brooklyn Gladiators players
Syracuse Stars (AA) players
Toledo Maumees players
19th-century baseball players
Baseball players from New Orleans
Major League Baseball left fielders
Major League Baseball right fielders
1861 births
1906 deaths
Minor league baseball managers
Macon (minor league baseball) players
Robert E. Lee's players
Savannah (minor league baseball) players
Memphis Browns players
Rochester Jingoes players
Memphis Grays players
Grand Rapids Shamrocks players
Lebanon Cedars players
New Orleans Pelicans (baseball) players
Memphis Giants players
Montgomery Colts players
Birmingham Grays players
Birmingham Blues players
Mobile Blackbirds players
People born in the Confederate States